Bodil Rosing (born Bodil Frederikke Hammerich; December 27, 1877  December 31, 1941) was a Danish-American film actress in the silent and sound eras.

Early years
Bodil Hammerich was born in Copenhagen, the daughter of music dean Angel Hammerich and pianist Golla Hammerich (née Bodenhoff-Rosing). She studied acting at the Royal Danish Theatre in the 1890s.

Career 
Rosing worked as a stage actress in Denmark, performing for three years with the Royal Danish Theatre. She had her stage debut in Henrik Christiernsson's comedy Gurli at the Dagmar Theatre in 1898. Her last role at the Dagmar Theatre was as Michelle in Camille in 1905. In 1904, she played Bianca in The Taming of the Shrew at the Casino Theatre.

During the early 1920s, she made one or two stage appearances on Broadway, including Fools Errant (1922), while raising her children alone.Bodil Rosing biography; ibdb.com; accessed July 28, 2015. She was retired from acting when she came to Hollywood in 1924, where her daughter married actor Monte Blue. There, she was suddenly chosen to play a film role, in inn Pretty Ladies (1925).

Rosing was under studio contract at MGM and often played matronly roles such as servants, housekeepers, cooks, or mothers. Her most notable role was perhaps Janet Gaynor's faithful maid in F.W. Murnau's silent film Sunrise: A Song of Two Humans (1927). With the advent of sound film, she mostly portrayed foreigners and proved herself an extremely versatile actress in a variety of ethnicities, in about 85 films until her death. She appeared as the wife of her Danish compatriot, Jean Hersholt, in The Painted Veil (1934) with Greta Garbo, replacing the originally cast Beulah Bondi to bring a warmer look to the role. She also played the German neighbor of Lionel Barrymore in You Can't Take It with You (1938) by Frank Capra.

 Personal life 
Rosing married a Norwegian doctor, Einer Jansen, in 1898; the couple had four children. They divorced in 1919.

 Death 
Rosing died of a heart attack, aged 64. Shortly before her death, Rosing stated about her acting: "My goal has always been to reach the heart of my audience."

Theatre roles in Denmark
Casino Theatre
 1904	Trold kan tæmmes as Bianca, Baptista's daughter

Dagmar Theatre
 1898	Gurli	Clara as Johanson, model / Julia, Skytt's daughter
 1898	Trold kan tæmmes as Bianca, Baptistas datter
 1898	Ungdom as Anna, Pastor Hoppe's maid
 1899	Cyrano de Bergerac as Marki
 1899	Fejltagelserne as Constance Neville
 1899	Henning Tondorf as Agnete Tripke
 1899	Johannes den Døber as Maccha, Salomes legesøster
 1899	Min svigerdatter as Marie
 1899	Naar klostermuren brydes as Søster Ermegard
 1899	Paa gale vej as Renee, Helene's daughter
 1899	Zaza as Clairette, varietedame
 1900	Under fire øjne as Erna, felix's wife
 1901	Atalanta as Enkefru Thomsen
 1901	En spurv i tranedans as Luise, Varbergs datter
 1901	Et piskesmæld as Colette
 1901	Kameliadamen as Nichette
 1901	Sovevagonen as Rosina, Charbonneaus datter
 1902	De fattiges dyrehave as Elisa, Conradsens datter
 1902	Esther as 	Birthe, bedstemor Bagges sønnedatter
 1902	Gurli as Julia, Skytt's daughter
 1902	Lille Hanne as Engel
 1902	Tre om een as Lotta, Mrs. Sandberg's maid
 1902	Zaza as Floriane, varietedame
 1903	1000 og 1  nat as Ascha, Suleimas veninde
 1903	Doktor Jojo as Eugenie, Josephins kone
 1903	Hjærtets begær as Olga Gerle
 1903	Kærlighed as	Ane-Sofie, Kristine's frined
1905	Kameliadamen as Theatre

Partial filmography

 Pretty Ladies (1925) - Minor Role (uncredited)
 The Tower of Lies (1925) - Midwife (uncredited)
 Lights of Old Broadway (1925) - Widow Gorman
 The Volga Boatman (1926) - Tartar Woman (uncredited)
 The Sporting Lover (1926) - Nora O'Brien
 It Must Be Love (1926) - Mom Schmidt
 The Midnight Kiss (1926) - Swedish maid
 The Return of Peter Grimm (1926) - Marta (uncredited)
 The City (1926) - Sarah
 Stage Madness (1927) - Maid
 Sunrise: A Song of Two Humans (1927) - The Maid
 Blondes by Choice (1927) - Caroline Bennett
 Wild Geese (1927) - Mrs. Sandbo
 The Law of the Range (1928) - Mother of Jim and the Kid
 The Big Noise (1928) - Ma Sloval
 The Port of Missing Girls (1928) - Elsa
 Ladies of the Mob (1928) - Yvonne's Mother
 Wheel of Chance (1928) - Sara Turkeltaub
 Out of the Ruins (1928) - Mère Gilbert
 The Fleet's In (1928) - Mrs. Deane
 The Woman from Moscow (1928) - Nadia
 King of the Rodeo (1929) - Mother
 Why Be Good? (1929) - Ma Kelly
 Eternal Love (1929) - Housekeeper
 Betrayal (1929) - Andre's Mother
 Broadway Babies (1929) - Durgan
 The Bishop Murder Case (1929) - Grete Menzel
 Hello Sister (1930) - Martha Peddie
 All Quiet on the Western Front (1930) - Mother of hospital patient (uncredited)
 A Lady's Morals (1930) - Innkeeper's Wife
 Oh, For a Man! (1930) - Masseuse (uncredited)
 Part Time Wife (1930) - Martha - the Cook
 Three Who Loved (1931) - Mrs. 'Aunt Anna' Larson
 Surrender (1931) - Domenica
 The Miracle Man (1932) - Townswoman (uncredited)
 Grand Hotel (1932) - Nurse Helping Old Lady Into Elevator (uncredited)
 Downstairs (1932) - Sophie - the Cook
 Six Hours to Live (1932) - Greta (uncredited)
 The Match King (1932) - Frau Necher (uncredited)
 Hallelujah, I'm a Bum (1933) - Matron (uncredited)
 The Crime of the Century (1933) - Hilda Ericson - Maid
 Reunion in Vienna (1933) - Kathie - the Krug Family Maid
 Ex-Lady (1933) - Mrs. Bauer - Helen's Mother
 Queen Christina (1933) - Innkeeper's Wife (uncredited)
 Hello, Sister (1933)
 Mandalay (1934) - Mrs. Kleinschmidt
 All Men Are Enemies (1934) - Landlady (uncredited)
 Little Man, What Now? (1934) - Frau Kleinholz
 Such Women Are Dangerous (1934) - Helma
 King Kelly of the U.S.A. (1934) - Sylvia, Tania's Chaperone
 Crimson Romance (1934) - Mama von Bergen
 The Painted Veil (1934) - Frau Koerber
 A Night at the Ritz (1935) - Mama Jaynos
 Roberta (1935) - Fernande
 Four Hours to Kill! (1935) - Ma
 Let 'Em Have It (1935) - Mrs. Keefer
 Thunder in the Night (1935) - Lisa
 Peter Ibbetson (1935) - Minor Role (scenes deleted)
 Hearts in Bondage (1936) - Mrs. Adams
 Libeled Lady (1936) - Wife of the Justice of the Peace (uncredited)
 Rose Bowl (1936) - Mrs. Schultz (uncredited)
 The Plot Thickens (1936) - Theresa the Cook (uncredited)
 Thin Ice (1937) - Otto's Wife (uncredited)
 Michael O'Halloran (1937) - Mrs. Polska
 Heidi (1937) - First Village Woman (uncredited)
 Breakfast for Two (1937) - Nanny - Blair's Household Staff (uncredited)
 Conquest (1937) - Anna - Servant (uncredited)
 The First Hundred Years (1938) - Martha
 You Can't Take It with You (1938) - Mrs. Schmidt
 The Great Waltz (1938) - Innkeeper's Wife (uncredited)
 Hotel Imperial (1939) - Ratty Old Woman (uncredited)
 Confessions of a Nazi Spy (1939) - Passenger on Boat
 The Star Maker (1939) - Mrs. Swanson
 Nurse Edith Cavell (1939) - Charlotte
 Hitler – Beast of Berlin (1939) - Frau Kohler
 Florian (1940) - Anna - Diana's Maid (uncredited)
 Four Sons (1940) - Townswoman (uncredited)
 The Mortal Storm (1940) - Old Woman on Train (uncredited)
 Reaching for the Sun (1941) - Rita's Mother
 They Dare Not Love (1941) - Leni (uncredited)
 No Greater Sin (1941) - 'Ma' James
 Man at Large (1941) - Klara, Botany's Housekeeper
 Marry the Boss's Daughter'' (1941) - Mrs. Polgar (final film role)

See also

References

External links
 
 portrait of Bodil Rosing(NY Public Library, Billy Rose Collection)
 
 

1877 births
1941 deaths
American film actresses
Actresses from Copenhagen
Danish emigrants to the United States
20th-century American actresses
American silent film actresses
Danish stage actresses
20th-century Danish actresses
Danish American
Burials at Forest Lawn Memorial Park (Glendale)